The Circle for Renewal and Progress (CRP)  was a political party in Gabon.

History
After the restoration of multi-party democracy, the party won one seat in the 1990 parliamentary elections. It retained its seat in the 1996 elections.

References

Defunct political parties in Gabon